15th National Assembly may refer to:

 15th National Assembly of France
 15th National Assembly of Pakistan
 15th National Assembly of South Korea
 15th National Assembly of Vietnam

